Marqu is a township in Doilungdêqên District in the Tibet Autonomous Region of China.

See also
List of towns and villages in Tibet

Populated places in Tibet